Ryu Sung-min (Hangul: 류성민; born February 28, 1993), better known by his stage name C Jamm (Hangul: 씨잼), is a South Korean rapper. He released his debut album, Good Boy Doing Bad Things on July 17, 2015. He is the runner-up of Show Me the Money 5, behind the winner, his childhood friend, BewhY. On 3 March 2022 after his release of EP, he left his label, Just Music.

Discography

Studio albums

Mixtapes

Singles

Awards and nominations

References

External links

1993 births
Living people
South Korean male rappers
South Korean hip hop singers
21st-century South Korean singers
Gachon University alumni